Asiab Jub-e Farmanfarma (also Romanized as Āsīāb Jūb-e Farmānfarmā; also known as Jūb-e Farmānfarmā) is a village in Gavrud Rural District, in the Central District of Sonqor County, Kermanshah Province, Iran. At the 2006 census, its population was 145, in 32 families.

References 

Populated places in Sonqor County